In economics, economic transformation refers to the continuous process of (1) moving labour and other resources from lower- to higher-productivity sectors (structural change) and (2) raising within-sector productivity growth. As such, economic transformation emphasises the movement from low- to high-productivity activities within and across all sectors (which can be tasks or activities that are combinations of agriculture, manufacturing and services). This movement of resources from lower- to higher-productivity activities is a key driver of economic development. 

Within-sector productivity growth (also called ′sector transformation') entails the adoption of new technologies and management practices that increase the efficiency of production. It can come about as a result of the increased efficiency of existing firms or as a result of the reallocation of resources away from the least productive firms towards more productive firms.

Measures of economic transformation 
Economic transformation can be measured through production/value-added measures and trade-based measures. Production-based measures include: (1) sector value added and employment data, to show productivity gaps between sectors; and (2) firm-level productivity measures, to examine average productivity levels of firms within one sector. 

Trade-based measures include: (1) measures of revealed comparative advantage to show the levels of specialisation of a country in certain exports; and (2) export diversification measures such as those produced by the International Monetary Fund.

References

Further reading 
Calabrese, L. and Tang, X. (2020) Africa’s economic transformation: the role of Chinese investment

McMillan, M., J. Page, D. Booth and D.W. te Velde (2017). Supporting Economic Transformation: An approach paper

Worral, L. K. Vrolijk, C. Mason and N. Balchin (2015). Baseline on economic transformation: Review of the international, regional and domestic literature on economic transformation

External links 
Supporting Economic Transformation programme

Economic development
Economic growth
Economic theories